The 2017 Liga 3 North Sumatra is the third edition of Liga 3 North Sumatra as a qualifying round for 2017 Liga 3. 

The competition scheduled starts on August 1, 2017.

Group A and B match will played at Mencirim City Stadium, Group C at Disporasu Mini Stadium, Group D at Baharuddin Siregar Stadium, Group E at Mutiara Kisaran Stadium and Group F at Pemda Mandailing Natal Stadium.

Teams
There are 29 clubs which will participate the league in this season.

References 

2017 in Indonesian football
Sport in North Sumatra
Seasons in Asian third tier association football leagues
Liga 3 (Indonesia) seasons